Paul Michael Mitchell Jr. (born August 19, 1949) is an American former Major League Baseball (MLB) pitcher who played from 1975 to 1980 for the Baltimore Orioles, Oakland Athletics, Seattle Mariners and Milwaukee Brewers.

Amateur career
Born in Worcester, Massachusetts, Mitchell graduated from Worcester Academy in 1968 and was selected by the Pittsburgh Pirates in the 18th round of the 1968 MLB draft. Rather than turn professional, he opted to attend Old Dominion University on a baseball scholarship. From 1969-71 he played collegiate summer baseball in the Cape Cod Baseball League (CCBL) for the Falmouth Commodores, leading Falmouth to the league championship in all three years and being named the league's outstanding pitcher in 1969 and 1970. Mitchell was selected by the Baltimore Orioles in the 1st round (7th overall) of the secondary phase of the 1971 MLB draft.

Professional career
Mitchell spent the 1972 season with the Double-A Asheville Orioles, and 1973-74 with the Triple-A Rochester Red Wings.

He made his MLB debut for Baltimore on July 1, 1975 at Fenway Park against the Boston Red Sox, and finished the season with a 3-0 record and a 3.63 earned run average in 11 games. In January of 1976, Jim Henneman of The Sporting News wrote that due to young pitchers "like Paul Mitchell and Mike Flanagan...the Orioles would no doubt be willing to sacrifice a pitcher with [Mike] Torrez's ability if it meant getting [Reggie] Jackson in return." Sure enough, the Orioles did trade Torrez to the Oakland Athletics for Jackson on April 2, but they included Mitchell in the deal. Don Baylor was the third player sent over from Baltimore, and in addition to Jackson, the Orioles also acquired Ken Holtzman and minor-league right-handed pitcher Bill Van Bommel. 

Mitchell posted a 9-7 record for Oakland in 1976, but struggled early in 1977 and was dealt mid-season to the Seattle Mariners, who had joined the American League as an expansion team for the 1977 season. In 1978, Mitchell led Seattle pitchers in wins, posting an 8-14 record for a Mariners team that lost 104 games. In 1979, Seattle traded Mitchell to the Milwaukee Brewers in exchange for Randy Stein. Mitchell made his final appearance with Milwaukee on September 21, 1980 against Seattle and was released prior to the 1981 season.

In all, Mitchell pitched in six major league seasons, recording a career win–loss record of 32–39 in 162 appearances. He is tied with four others for the all-time major league career record for fielding percentage among pitchers who have at least 500 innings pitched. In 621.1 innings of work, Mitchell handled 114 chances, recording 32 putouts and 82 assists without a single error, for a perfect career fielding percentage of 1.000. 

In 2002, Mitchell was inducted into the Cape Cod Baseball League Hall of Fame, and in 2011 he served as honorary captain of the West Division team at the CCBL All-Star Game at Fenway Park.

References

External links

 Baltimore Orioles 1971 scouting report of Paul Mitchell

1949 births
Living people
American expatriate baseball players in Canada
Asheville Orioles players
Baltimore Orioles players
Baseball players from Worcester, Massachusetts
Chattanooga Lookouts players
Columbus Clippers players
Falmouth Commodores players
Major League Baseball pitchers
Milwaukee Brewers players
Oakland Athletics players
Old Dominion Monarchs baseball players
Old Dominion University alumni
Rochester Red Wings players
San Jose Missions players
Seattle Mariners players
Tucson Toros players
Vancouver Canadians players
Worcester Academy alumni